Events from the year 2012 in Serbia:

Incumbents 
 President: 
 until 5 April: Boris Tadić 
 5 April–31 May: Slavica Đukić Dejanović
 starting 31 May: Tomislav Nikolić
 Prime Minister: Mirko Cvetković (until 27 July), Ivica Dačić (starting 27 July)

Architecture 

1 January: Ada Bridge, one of the tallest bridges in Europe, is completed and open to the public in Belgrade, Serbia.

Events

January 
 Romanian Consulate General was founded in Zaječar

April 
 4 April: Serbian pro-Western President Boris Tadić resigned, paving the way for early presidential election where he will face strong challenge from a nationalist candidate.

May 
 Elections on all levels were held.

Sports
 Serbia participated in 2012 Summer Olympics in London.
 2011–12 Serbian SuperLiga
 2012–13 Serbian SuperLiga

Deaths

January 
 13 January – Miljan Miljanić, 81, Serbian footballer, coach and administrator.
 29 January – Predrag Dragić, 66, Serbian writer. (Serbian)

February 
 18 February – Zvezdan Čebinac, 72, Serbian football player and manager.

March 
 1 March – Blagoje Adžić, 79, Serbian politician. (Serbian)
 11 March – Miomir Vukobratović, 81, Serbian mechanical engineer.

April 
 28 April – Milan N. Popović, 87, Serbian psychiatrist and author. (Serbian)

May 
 5 May – Stevan Bena, 76, Serbian footballer. (Serbian)

June 
 28 June – Miloš Blagojević, 81, Serbian historian.

August 
 14 August – Svetozar Gligorić, Serbian chess grandmaster (b. 1923)

September 
 4 September – Milan Vukelić, 76, Serbian football player.
 15 September – Predrag Brzaković, 47, Serbian footballer.

October 
 5 October – Vojin Dimitrijević, 80, Serbian human rights activist.
 25 October – Olga Jančić, 83, Serbian sculptor.

December 
 4 December – Branislav Milinković, 52, Serbian diplomat, ambassador to NATO and Austria, suicide by jumping.
 7 December – Nikola Ilić, 27, Serbian basketball player, cancer.

See also  
 2011 in Serbia
 2012

References 

 
Serbia
Years of the 21st century in Serbia